Venezuela competed at the 2016 Summer Olympics in Rio de Janeiro, Brazil, from 5 to 21 August 2016. It was the nation's eighteenth consecutive appearance at the Summer Olympics.

The Venezuelan Olympic Committee fielded a team of 87 athletes, 62 men and 25 women, to compete in twenty sports at the Games. It was the nation's second-largest delegation sent to the Olympics, falling short of the record set in Beijing 2008 (108) by nearly twenty percent. Men's basketball was the only team-based sport in which Venezuela qualified for the Games, returning to the Olympic basketball for the first time since 1992. Venezuela also made its debut in golf (new to the 2016 Games) and women's beach volleyball, as well as its return to equestrian, rowing, and taekwondo events after eight years.

The Venezuelan roster featured 28 returning Olympians, with fencers Silvio Fernández and Alejandra Benítez, along with multiple-stroke swimmer Albert Subirats, headed to their fourth Games as the most experienced competitors of the team. Other notable Venezuelan athletes included artistic gymnast Jessica López, amateur welterweight boxer and Pan American Games champion Gabriel Maestre, 2015 world BMX champion Stefany Hernández, and fencing brothers Francisco and Rubén Limardo, who became the nation's first gold medalist since 1968 at the previous Games. Looking to defend his men's épée title in Rio de Janeiro, the elder Limardo was selected by the public through a nationwide online vote to carry the Venezuelan flag at the opening ceremony, the first male from his country to do so since 2004.

Unlike the previous Games, Venezuela failed to produce another gold-medal winning feat in Rio de Janeiro, but left instead with three medals (one silver and two bronze), which matched its overall tally from the 1984 Summer Olympics in Los Angeles. These medals were awarded to the following athletes for the first time in their respective sporting events: a silver to triple jumper Yulimar Rojas, and a bronze each to Hernández and flyweight boxer Yoel Finol. Finol would later be upgraded from bronze to silver after Russian boxer Misha Aloyan was disqualified

Medalists

| width=78% align=left valign=top |

| width="22%" align="left" valign="top" |

Competitors

Archery

One Venezuelan archer qualified for the men's individual recurve by obtaining one of the eight Olympic places available from the 2015 World Archery Championships in Copenhagen, Denmark. Meanwhile, another Venezuelan archer has been added to the squad by securing one of three available Olympic spots in the women's individual recurve at the Pan American Qualification Tournament in Medellín, Colombia.

Athletics (track and field)

Venezuelan athletes have so far achieved qualifying standards in the following athletics events (up to a maximum of 3 athletes in each event):

Track & road events
Men

Women

Field events

Basketball

Men's tournament

Venezuela men's basketball team qualified for the Olympics by attaining a top two finish towards the final match of the 2015 FIBA Americas Championship in Mexico.

Team roster

Group play

Boxing

Venezuela has entered seven boxers to compete in each of the following weight classes into the Olympic boxing tournament. Luis Angel Cabrera, Luis Arcon, Albert Ramirez, and 2012 Olympian Gabriel Maestre had claimed their Olympic spots at the 2016 American Qualification Tournament in Buenos Aires. Meanwhile, Yoel Finol Rivas, Victor Rodríguez, Endry José Pinto, and Edgar Muñoz secured additional places on the Venezuelan roster at the 2016 APB and WSB Olympic Qualifier in Vargas.

Cycling

Road
Venezuelan riders qualified for the following quota places in the men's Olympic road race by virtue of their top 5 national ranking in the 2015 UCI America Tour (for men), and top 22 in the 2016 UCI World Ranking (for women). One additional spot was awarded to the Venezuela cyclist in the women's road race, by virtue of a top national finish, not yet qualified, at the 2016 Pan American Championships.

Track
Following the completion of the 2016 UCI Track Cycling World Championships, Venezuelan riders have accumulated spots in the men's team sprint and women's omnium. As a result of their place in the men's team sprint, Venezuela has won the right to enter two riders in both men's sprint and men's keirin.

Sprint

Team sprint

Keirin

Omnium

BMX
Venezuelan riders qualified for one men's and one women's quota place for BMX at the Olympics, as a result of the nation's top three placement for men, not yet qualified, at the 2016 UCI BMX World Championships, and seventh-place finish for women in the UCI Olympic Ranking List of May 31, 2016. London 2012 Olympian Stefany Hernández and rookie Jefferson Milano were named to the Olympic roster on June 1, 2016.

Diving 

Venezuelan divers qualified for two individual spots at the Olympics by virtue of a top 18 finish respectively at the 2016 FINA World Cup series.

Equestrian

Venezuela has entered two jumping riders into the Olympic equestrian competition by virtue of a top six individual finish at the 2015 Pan American Games.

Jumping

Fencing

Venezuelan fencers have qualified a full squad each in the men's team épée by virtue of being the highest ranking team from America outside the world's top four in the FIE Olympic Team Rankings. Aiming to appear at fourth Olympics, Alejandra Benítez had claimed the spot on the Venezuelan team in the women's sabre as one of the two highest-ranked fencers coming from the America zone in the FIE Adjusted Official Rankings. Isis Giménez and 2011 Pan American Games bronze medalist Antonio Leal rounded out the Venezuelan fencing roster by finishing among the top two in the men's and women's foil, respectively, at the Pan American Zonal Qualifier in San José, Costa Rica.

Men

Women

Golf

Venezuela has entered one golfer into the Olympic tournament. Jhonattan Vegas (world no. 240) qualified directly among the top 60 players for the men's event based on the IGF World Rankings as of July 11, 2016.

Gymnastics

Artistic
Venezuela has entered one artistic gymnast for the first time into the Olympic competition. Jessica López confirmed her third straight Olympic appearance by securing a spot in the women's apparatus and all-around events at the Olympic Test Event in Rio de Janeiro.

Women

Judo

Venezuela has qualified one judoka for the women's middleweight category (70 kg) at the Games. Elvismar Rodríguez earned a continental quota spot from the Pan American region, as the highest-ranked Venezuelan judoka outside of direct qualifying position in the IJF World Ranking List of May 30, 2016.

Rowing

Venezuela has qualified one boat in the men's single sculls for the Games at the 2016 Latin American Continental Qualification Regatta in Valparaiso, Chile.

Qualification Legend: FA=Final A (medal); FB=Final B (non-medal); FC=Final C (non-medal); FD=Final D (non-medal); FE=Final E (non-medal); FF=Final F (non-medal); SA/B=Semifinals A/B; SC/D=Semifinals C/D; SE/F=Semifinals E/F; QF=Quarterfinals; R=Repechage

Sailing

Venezuelan sailors have qualified one boat in each of the following classes through the individual fleet World Championships, and South American qualifying regattas.

M = Medal race; EL = Eliminated – did not advance into the medal race

Shooting

Venezuela has qualified one shooter to compete in the men's rifle events by virtue of his best finish at the 2015 Pan American Games, as long as he obtained a minimum qualifying score (MQS) by March 31, 2016.

Qualification Legend: Q = Qualify for the next round; q = Qualify for the bronze medal (shotgun)

Swimming

Venezuelan swimmers have so far achieved qualifying standards in the following events (up to a maximum of 2 swimmers in each event at the Olympic Qualifying Time (OQT), and potentially 1 at the Olympic Selection Time (OST)):

Table tennis

Venezuela has entered one athlete into the table tennis competition at the Games. Gremlins Arvelo secured the Olympic spot in the women's singles by virtue of her top six finish at the 2016 Latin American Qualification Tournament in Santiago, Chile.

Taekwondo

Venezuela entered one athlete into the taekwondo competition at the Olympics. Edgar Contreras secured a spot in the men's lightweight category (68 kg) by virtue of his top two finish at the 2016 Pan American Qualification Tournament in Aguascalientes, Mexico.

Volleyball

Beach
Venezuela women's beach volleyball team qualified directly for the Olympics by winning the final match over Argentina at the 2016 CSV Continental Cup in Rosario.

Weightlifting

Venezuelan weightlifters have qualified three women's quota places for the Rio Olympics based on their combined team standing by points at the 2014 and 2015 IWF World Championships. Meanwhile, a single men's Olympic spot was added to the Venezuelan roster by virtue of his top 15 individual finish, among those who had not secured any quota places through the World or Pan American Championships, in the IWF World Rankings as of June 20, 2016. The place was awarded to Jesús López in the men's featherweight division (62 kg).

Wrestling

Venezuela has qualified a total of nine wrestlers for each of the following weight classes into the Olympic competition. Majority of Olympic berths were awarded to Venezuelan wrestlers, who progressed to the top two finals at the 2016 Pan American Qualification Tournament. Meanwhile, two further wrestlers had claimed the remaining Olympic slots to round out the Venezuelan roster at the initial meet of the World Qualification Tournament in Ulaanbaatar.

Men's freestyle

Men's Greco-Roman

Women's freestyle

See also
Venezuela at the 2015 Pan American Games
Venezuela at the 2016 Summer Paralympics

References

External links 

 

Nations at the 2016 Summer Olympics
2016
2016 in Venezuelan sport